Nicobi may refer to:

 Nicobi River in Quebec, Canada
 Nicobi Lake in Quebec, Canada